Westernach is a river of Bavaria, Germany. It is a tributary of the Mindel near Mindelheim.

See also
List of rivers of Bavaria

References

Rivers of Bavaria
Rivers of Germany